In My Life is the fifth studio album by American singer and songwriter Judy Collins, released by Elektra Records in 1966. It peaked at No. 46 on the Billboard Pop Albums charts in 1967.

Working with arranger Joshua Rifkin, many of the songs on the album feature orchestral arrangements, a departure from Collins' previous albums, which consist of more straightforward folk music. The album includes work by Leonard Cohen, the Beatles, Bob Dylan and Richard Fariña. Collins' version of the song "Suzanne" is considered to be the recording that introduced Cohen's music to a wide audience.

In a retrospective review for AllMusic, William Ruhlmann stated, "Judy Collins was already an accomplished interpretive singer before recording this album, but In My Life found her widening her horizons and revealing an even greater gift than one might have imagined; for the most part, it's a superb album and still one of her best."

In 1970, the album was certified Gold by the RIAA for sales of over 500,000 copies in the US.

Track listing

Personnel
Judy Collins – guitar, keyboards, vocals

Technical
Joshua Rifkin – arranger, conductor (tracks 1–3, 6–8, 10)
Mark Abramson – producer
Jac Holzman – production supervisor
William S. Harvey – front cover photo, design
Joel Brodsky – back cover photo

References

Judy Collins albums
1966 albums
Albums produced by Mark Abramson
Elektra Records albums
Albums arranged by Joshua Rifkin
Albums conducted by Joshua Rifkin